Thaai Mookaambikai is a 1982 Indian Tamil-language devotional film directed by K. Shankar, starring K. R. Vijaya, Jaishankar, Sivakumar, Sujatha and other leading actors. The film was released on 9 July 1982.

Plot

Cast 

K. R. Vijaya as Raakayi / Mookayi / Thaai Mookambigai
Thengai Srinivasan as Village President
Major Sundarrajan as Bhattar
Sujatha as Poorani
Sivakumar as Senthil, Raakayi elder son
Poornima Bhagyaraj as Durga
M. N. Nambiar as Durga's Father
Saritha as Vellayamma, Raakayi daughter
Manorama as Ranjani
Oru Viral Krishna Rao as Kaambothi
Nizhalgal Ravi as Sarangan
Karthik as Muthu, Raakayi second son
Jai Shankar as Kannappan
Jai Ganesh as Mani, Bhattar's Son
Gundu Kalyanam
V. Gopalakrishnan as Inspector Gopi
M. Balamuralikrishna as Singer
M. S. Viswanathan as Singer
Sirkazhi Govindarajan as Singer

Soundtrack 
Music was composed by Ilaiyaraaja, with lyrics by Vaali. The song "Janani Janani" from this film remains one of the famous devotional songs in Tamil. The song is set in Kalyani raga.  The song Isai Arasi (Isaiyarasi), one of the most complex compositions in Film Music, is based on a rare Carnatic raga, Surya.

Ilayaraja said he "was running out of time while composing the tune for the song. I was under hectic pressure from the film producer, who had planned to perform the ‘puja’ for the film the next day with the song" Initial tune which he had composed did not suit the character Sri Adi Sankarar. He said with a chance to have a glimpse of the portrait of Adi Sankarar, he was inspired to compose the tune which was similar to Bhaja Govindam.

References

External links 
 

1980s Tamil-language films
1982 films
Films directed by K. Shankar
Films scored by Ilaiyaraaja
Hindu devotional films